List of all World Professional Showdance World Champions, July 2017:

 1989 Marcus and Karen Hilton - England 
 1990 Micheal Hull and Patsy Hull-Krogull - Germany 
 1991 Micheal Hull and Patsy Hull-Krogull - Germany 
 1992 Jens Jorgens and Kersten Jorgens-Neubert - Germany 
 1993 Marcus and Karen Hilton - England 
 1994 Marcus and Karen Hilton - England 
 1995 Kim Rygel and Cecilie Rygel- Norway 
 1996 Timothy Howson and Joanne Bolton - England 
 1997 Massimo Giorgianni and Alessia Giorgianni - Italy 
 1998 Massimo Giorgianni and Alessia Giorgianni - Italy 
 1999 Massimo Giorgianni and Alessia Giorgianni - Italy 
 2000 Massimo Giorgianni and Alessia Giorgianni - Italy 
 2001 Massimo Giorgianni and Alessia Giorgianni - Italy 
 2002 Massimo Giorgianni and Alessia Giorgianni - Italy 
 2003 William Pino and Alessandra Bucciarelli - Italy 
 2004 Jonathan Wilkins and Katusha Demidova - USA 
 2005 Sergey Mikheev and Anastasia Sidoran - Russia 
 2006 Roberta Villa and Morena Colagreco - Italy 
 2007 Guoyong Zhang and Hunahuan She  - China 
 2008 Stanislav Bekmametov and Natalia Urban - Italy 
 2009 Roberto Regnoli and Tania Berto - Italy 
 2010 Paolo Bosco and Silvia Pitton - Italy 
 2011 Fabrizio Cravero and Loreno Cravero - Italy 
 2012 Ivan Krylov and Natalia Smirnova - Russia 
 2013 Stefan Zoglauer and Sandra Koperski - Germany 
 2014 Stefan Zoglauer and Sandra Koperski - Germany 
 2015 Paul Lorenz and Yulia Spesivtseva - Russia 
 2016 Alexandr Zhiratkov and Irina Novozhilova - Russia 
 2017 Craig Shaw and Evgeniya Shaw - England

References

See also
World Ballroom Dance Champions
World Latin Dance Champions

Ballroom dance